Kalateh-ye Hajji Ali may refer to:
Kalateh-ye Hajji Ali Dad 
Kalateh-ye Hajj Ali